Bob Howes (born January 4, 1943) is a former professional Canadian football offensive lineman who played fourteen seasons in the Canadian Football League, mainly for the Edmonton Eskimos. He was a part of five Grey Cup championship teams with the Eskimos. Howes played college football and basketball at Queen's University, and has coached the Queen's Golden Gaels football team for many years, both as an assistant and as head coach. His son Beau Howes played quarterback for the Gaels during the 1990s.

References

External links
 Bob Howes at ProFootballArchives

1943 births
Living people
BC Lions players
Canadian football offensive linemen
Canadian players of Canadian football
Edmonton Elks players
Queen's Golden Gaels football players